John W. Ryan (November 12, 1926 – August 13, 1991) was an American designer.  Ryan worked at toy company Mattel for 20 years, becoming the company's vice president of research and development, and subsequently working as a consultant. He was responsible for the Barbie doll, Hot Wheels, and Chatty Cathy. He was the sixth husband of actress Zsa Zsa Gabor.

Career
Ryan graduated from Yale University, after which he worked at aerospace company Raytheon as an engineer, working on the AIM-7 Sparrow and MIM-23 Hawk missiles.

Mattel hired him for his "space-aged savvy" and knowledge of materials.

In 1956, Mattel co-owner Ruth Handler returned from a European vacation with a German-designed Bild Lilli doll. She and Ryan worked on producing a similar fashion doll for the American market (the two later disputed which of them was chiefly responsible for the doll's design).

Ryan went on to lead Mattel's research and development department, with a research and development budget in 1962 of $1.5 million US dollars. He developed Chatty Cathy, Ken, Hot Wheels, and Larry the Lion, and was involved in creating the voice systems for Chatty Cathy, Barbie, and Larry the Lion.

Ryan worked on the V-rroom! X-15 velocipede which was named after the North American X-15 rocket-powered aircraft, and patented the V-RROOM! toy engines that simulated motorcycle engine sounds.

Ryan's relationship with Mattel soured, and in 1980 he sued Mattel for royalties; the company settled out of court.

Death
Ryan suffered a debilitating stroke in 1989; he died by gun suicide on August 13, 1991.

References

|-
!colspan="3" style="background:#C1D8FF;"| Husband of a Gabor Sister

1926 births
1991 deaths
20th-century American engineers
Mattel people